Microsoft Windows SDK, and its predecessors Platform SDK, and .NET Framework SDK, are software development kits (SDKs) from Microsoft that contain documentation, header files, libraries, samples and tools required to develop applications for Microsoft Windows and .NET Framework. Platform SDK specializes in developing applications for Windows 2000, XP and Windows Server 2003. .NET Framework SDK is dedicated to developing applications for .NET Framework 1.1 and .NET Framework 2.0. Windows SDK is the successor of the two and supports developing applications for Windows XP and later, as well as .NET Framework 3.0 and later.

Features 
Platform SDK is the successor of the original Microsoft Windows SDK for Windows 3.1x and Microsoft Win32 SDK for Windows 9x. It was released in 1999 and is the oldest SDK. Platform SDK contains compilers, tools, documentations, header files, libraries and samples needed for software development on IA-32, x64 and IA-64 CPU architectures.  however, came to being with .NET Framework. Starting with Windows Vista, the Platform SDK, .NET Framework SDK, Tablet PC SDK and Windows Media SDK are replaced by a new unified kit called Windows SDK. However, the .NET Framework 1.1 SDK is not included since the .NET Framework 1.1 does not ship with Windows Vista. (Windows Media Center SDK for Windows Vista ships separately.) DirectX SDK was merged into Windows SDK with the release of Windows 8.

Windows SDK allows the user to specify the components to be installed and where to install them. It integrates with Visual Studio, so that multiple copies of the components that both have are not installed; however, there are compatibility caveats if either of the two is not from the same era. Information shown can be filtered by content, such as showing only new Windows Vista content, only .NET Framework content, or showing content for a specific language or technology.

Windows SDKs are available for free; they were once available on Microsoft Download Center but were moved to MSDN in 2012.

A developer might want to use an older SDK for a particular reason. For example, the Windows Server 2003 Platform SDK released in February 2003 was the last SDK to provide full support of Visual Studio 6.0. Some older PSDK versions can still be downloaded from the Microsoft Download center; others can be ordered on CD/DVD.

Documentation 
The Windows SDK documentation includes manuals documenting:
 Desktop app development with Windows API and managed code
 Metro-style app development using Windows Runtime and Universal Windows Platform
 Web app development using ASP.NET, HTML, CSS and JavaScript
 Language-related topics for C++, C#, Visual Basic.NET, F#, JavaScript, CSS and HTML, such as syntax and conventions (Windows PowerShell language is not covered.)

See also 
 MSDN Library
 Windows Driver Kit
 Windows App SDK
Windows 10 Version History

References

External links 
 Windows SDK Blog
Windows SDK Archive

Microsoft development tools
Software development kits